The 2017 Oceania U20 Athletics Championships were held at the ANZ Stadium in Suva, Fiji, between June 28 and July 1, 2017. They were held together with the 2017 Oceania Senior Championships and the 2017 Oceania U18 Athletics Championships.

Medal summary
Complete results can be found on the Oceania Athletics Association webpage.

References

Oceania Junior Athletics Championships
International athletics competitions hosted by Fiji
Oceania U20 Athletics Championships
Oceania U20 Championships|Oceania U20 Athletics Championships